Zodarion abantense is a species of spider found in Greece.

See also
 List of Zodariidae species

External links
 

arabelae
Spiders of Europe
Fauna of Greece
Spiders described in 2009